Vandortuzumab vedotin (INN; development code RG7450) is a humanized monoclonal antibody designed for the treatment of cancer.

This drug was developed by Genentech/Roche. Development was discontinued in 2017.

References 

Abandoned drugs
Monoclonal antibodies for tumors
Antibody-drug conjugates